Live in Tokyo is a live album by American pianist and composer Brad Mehldau released on the Nonesuch label in 2004.

Reception

The album received universally favourable reviews. AllMusic awarded the album 4½ stars and called it an "intense, cerebral, and beautiful album". The Guardian's John Fordham identifies it as "Another bold step on Mehldau's imperious way".

On All About Jazz, Doug Collete noted "Mehldau plays beautifully on his own, his work is florid with detail, yet never just flowery. There is a deeply felt passion in all he plays, and that's exactly why he is so engrossing to hear: in a solo setting Mehldau demonstrates how he selects his ideas altogether discriminatingly from what must be a veritable flood of variations that occur to him as he plays. It's not long into listening to Live in Tokyo that you are reminded how skillfully he runs the gamut of emotion in his playing". 
 
JazzTimes reviewer, Harvey Siders commented "Few pianists can match Brad Mehldau when it comes to cross-fertilizing jazz, classical and rock. The same applies for technique, taste and intellectual curiosity. All of those qualities are on display in Mehldau's latest CD".

Track listing 
All compositions by Brad Mehldau except as indicated

Single Disc International Edition
 "Things Behind the Sun" (Nick Drake) - 4:37
 "Intro" - 2:42
 "Someone to Watch Over Me" (George Gershwin, Ira Gershwin) - 9:55
 "From This Moment On" (Cole Porter) - 7:55
 "Monk's Dream" (Thelonious Monk) - 7:59
 "Paranoid Android" (Colin Greenwood, Phil Selway, Thom Yorke) - 19:29
 "How Long Has This Been Going On?" (Gershwin, Gershwin) - 9:00
 "River Man" (Drake) - 8:59
  
Two Disc Japanese Edition  

Disc One:
 "Intro" - 4:37  
 "50 Ways to Leave Your Lover" (Paul Simon) - 6:30  
 "My Heart Stood Still" (Lorenz Hart, Richard Rodgers) - 9:32  
 "Roses Blue" (Joni Mitchell) - 8:16  
 "Intro II" - 2:37  
 "Someone to Watch Over Me" (Gershwin, Gershwin) - 10:08  
 "Things Behind the Sun" (Drake) - 4:49  
Disc Two:
 "C Tune" - 5:52  
 "Waltz Tune" - 5:24  
 "From This Moment On" (Porter) - 7:57  
 "Alfie" (Burt Bacharach, Hal David) - 6:50  
 "Monk's Dream" (Monk) - 7:59  
 "Paranoid Android" (Greenwood, O'Brien, Yorke) - 19:29  
 "How Long Has This Been Going On?" (Gershwin, Gershwin) - 9:00  
 "River Man" (Drake) - 8:58

Personnel 
Brad Mehldau - Piano

Credits 
Produced by Brad Mehldau
Recorded by Yoshihito Saegusa 
Mastering by Greg Calbi 
Design by Barbara de Wilde
Photography by Michael Wilson and Ye Rin Mok

References 

Nonesuch Records live albums
Brad Mehldau live albums
2004 live albums
Solo piano jazz albums